Fish Out of Water is the debut studio album by English bassist and songwriter Chris Squire, released in November 1975 by Atlantic Records. The album was recorded during a period in which each band member of Yes had taken down time to produce a solo album. Some of the musicians Squire hired for the project were former Yes drummer Bill Bruford, then-Yes keyboardist Patrick Moraz, King Crimson saxophonist Mel Collins and Canterbury scene flautist Jimmy Hastings. Squire's former bandmate in The Syn, Andrew Pryce Jackman, played all the keyboards not performed by Moraz (excepting the cathedral pipe organ performed by Barry Rose) and orchestrated the material.

Fish Out of Water reached No. 25 in the UK and No. 69 in the U.S. Despite it being well received by critics and fans, Squire would not record another solo album until 2007, releasing an album of Christmas music entitled Chris Squire's Swiss Choir.

Production

Background and recording
In August 1975, the progressive rock band Yes ended their tour in support of Relayer (1974) and agreed to take time off for each member to record a solo album. When Squire started work on his, he contacted Andrew Pryce Jackman, a childhood friend and keyboardist/composer, who assisted with the album's conception and orchestration. Over the course of their collaboration, Jackman also contributed significantly to the writing. Squire offered to give him co-writing credits, but Jackman declined.

Fish Out of Water was recorded in the spring and summer of 1975 in two studios: New Pipers, Chris Squire's home studio in Surrey, and Morgan Studios in London. The title refers to his nickname "Fish", and being "...Out of Water" due to making music without Yes for the first time.

Songs
The introduction to "Hold Out Your Hand" features a passage played on the pipe organ at St Paul's Cathedral by cathedral organist Barry Rose, who had known Squire and Jackman during their boyhoods. The organ continues throughout the song, creating a rather original sound and reflecting Squire and Jackman's experiences together as church choristers. The title of "Lucky Seven" refers to the song being in a 7/8 time signature. A melodic passage from Yes's song "Close to the Edge" appears in the finale of "Safe (Canon Song)". The closing passage on "Safe" was played on the 4-string bass section of a double-neck guitar, using only the pickups of the 6-string guitar section.

Release

Fish Out of Water was released in November 1975. "Lucky Seven" was edited into a single by producer Tom Dowd which only saw a US release. "Hold Out Your Hand" was later performed by Yes during their 1976 North American tour with Squire singing the lead vocal. One critic at the concert wrote for Circus magazine: "Some ten thousand people responded to the Squire tune with a standing ovation". To further promote the album, a promotional film of "Hold Out Your Hand" and "You by My Side" was made in a studio; it featured mimed performances, with Bill Bruford, Patrick Moraz and Andrew Pryce Jackman appearing on their respective instruments in front of a small orchestra and against a white background. The orchestra was composed of players from the London Symphony Orchestra, who were on their way to record for another project. Squire could only afford a short amount of their time (roughly half an hour, which cost £3,000).

"Silently Falling" is sampled on "Falling Down" by New Zealand DJ and producer P-Money on his album Everything (2010).

Reissues and sequel
In a 2004 interview, Squire said that he wished to produce a 5.1 surround sound mix of the album using the master tapes, but declared the recordings had disappeared from Atlantic's archives. On 28 February 2006, it was reissued in the US by Wounded Bird Records. This was followed in August 2007 by a two-disc "Deluxe Expanded Edition" released on Squire's own label, Stone Ghost Records, (distributed by Castle/Sanctuary Records). The set included bonus material: a single edit of "Lucky Seven", the promotional film for "Hold Out Your Hand" and "You by My Side", track-by-track commentary, and a 40-minute interview with Squire conducted in November 2006.

Following the album's release, Squire never recorded a follow-up although said he was frequently asked about such a project. He had hoped to reunite with Jackman and work on one together, but such plans ended following Jackman's death in 2003. In 2012, he reasoned much of the album's appeal and the strength of its music was down to his collaboration with Jackman. Though Squire had started to prepare pieces for more solo albums, he consistently found himself utilizing this material for band projects, including those with Billy Sherwood and Steve Hackett.

In 2018, a 7-disc deluxe edition was released, containing all of the previously available material plus new 5.1 and stereo mixes. In 2020, a one-disc blu-ray edition was released.

Track listing
All tracks written, arranged and produced by Chris Squire.

"Return of the Fox" is the B-side for Chris Squire & Alan White's single "Run with the Fox" (1981). Both tracks are written by Chris Squire, Alan White & former King Crimson lyricist Peter Sinfield.

Personnel
Credits are adapted from the album's UK and US release liner notes.

Musicians
 Chris Squire – lead and backing vocals, bass guitar, 12-string guitar (tracks 3 and 5)
 Bill Bruford – drums, percussion
 Mel Collins – tenor saxophone (track 3), alto & soprano saxophones (track 4)
 Jimmy Hastings – flute (track 2)
 Patrick Moraz – synthesiser, organ on track 3
 Barry Rose – pipe organ (track 1)
 Andrew Pryce Jackman – acoustic and electric pianos, orchestration, conductor
 Julian Gaillard – strings leader
 John Wilbraham – brass leader
 Jim Buck – horns leader
 Adrian Bett – woodwinds leader
 Nikki Squire – backing vocals (track 1)

Production
 Chris Squire – producer
 Greg Jackman – engineer
 Nigel Luby – assistant engineer
 Laurence Bernes – cover design and photography
 Phil Carson – overdubs, mastering
 Trevor Spencer – mastering
  – mastering
 Brian Lane – front cover Polaroid photograph
 Peter Sinfield – suggestions for "Safe (Canon Song)"
 Trevor Spencer – finishing touches
 Graham Presket – finishing touches

Charts

Certifications

References

Chris Squire albums
1975 debut albums
Atlantic Records albums
Progressive rock albums by English artists